Damien Quigley (born 1971 in Limerick, Ireland) is a retired Irish sportsperson. He played hurling with his local club Na Piarsaigh and was a member of the Limerick senior inter-county team in the 1990s and 2000s. Quigley won an All Star in 1994 after his consistently strong performances throughout the championship and subsequently in the All-Ireland final. He is most noted for a great acrobatic goal which he scored in the final against Offaly. The goal was ranked at number 46 of The Greatest Hurling Goals of all time.

References

1971 births
Living people
Na Piarsaigh (Limerick) hurlers
Limerick inter-county hurlers
Munster inter-provincial hurlers